Santa Cruz Esporte Clube was a football (soccer) club from Barra do Bugres, Mato Grosso, Brazil. It was founded on December 25, 1982.

References

Defunct football clubs in Mato Grosso
Association football clubs established in 1982
1982 establishments in Brazil